Aleksey Vladimirovich Dmitrik (Russian: Алексей Владимирович Дмитрик; born 12 April 1984) is a Russian high jumper. He won the silver medal at the 2009 European Indoor Championships.

He was born in Slantsy, Leningrad Oblast. He won the gold medal at the 2001 World Youth Championships, finished fourteenth at the 2002 World Junior Championships and was the runner-up to Jaroslav Bába at the 2003 European Athletics Junior Championships. His first major win as a senior athlete came at the 2005 European Cup. He also competed at the 2007 European Indoor Championships, but without reaching the final. He achieved a personal best jump of 2.33 m in Thessaloniki in June 2009. He has 2.34 metres on the indoor track, achieved in January 2005 in Glasgow.

As one of three Russians in the men's high jump at the 2010 European Athletics Championships, he came seventh with a clearance of 2.26 m while Aleksander Shustov and Ivan Ukhov took the top two spots. In the 2011 season, he set a meet record of 2.30 m at the Meeting Grand Prix IAAF de Dakar, going on to jump an outright personal best of 2.35 m at the Gran Premio Iberoamericano in Huelva, Spain (which was also a world leading performance).

At the 2011 World Championships in Athletics he outperformed his compatriots Ivan Ukhov and Aleksandr Shustov by clearing 2.35 m. This mark brought Dmitrik the silver medal as he finished behind Jesse Williams on countback. The following year he won the Hochsprung mit Musik meet in February 2012, again beating Ukhov.

Competition record

References

1984 births
Living people
People from Slantsy
Sportspeople from Leningrad Oblast
Russian male high jumpers
World Athletics Championships athletes for Russia
World Athletics Championships medalists
World Youth Championships in Athletics winners
Russian Athletics Championships winners